From the Reach is the eleventh studio album from Sonny Landreth. Released on May 20, 2008, it is his first album to be released under his own label Landfall Records. The album features appearances by Jimmy Buffett, Eric Clapton, Robben Ford, Vince Gill, Eric Johnson, Dr. John, Mark Knopfler, and Nadirah Shakoor.

The album title refers to water imagery that occurred for Landreth during the writing process. It also refers to Landreth asking other musicians to join him on the album.

Track listing
"Blue Tarp Blues" (Landreth) - 4:39
"When I Still Had You" (Landreth) - 4:42
"Way Past Long" (Landreth) - 5:08
"The Milky Way Home" (Landreth) - 4:10
"Storm of Worry" (Landreth) - 3:56
"Howlin' Moon" (Landreth) - 5:19
"The Goin' On" (Landreth, Wendy Waldman) - 3:25
"Let It Fly" (Landreth) - 4:52
"Blue Angel" (Landreth) - 4:00
"Überesso" (Landreth) - 2:44
"Universe" (Landreth) - 3:38

Personnel
Sonny Landreth - lead vocals, lead guitar
David Ranson - bass
Michael Burch - drums
Steve Conn - keys
Sam Broussard - keys, acoustic guitar
Tony Daigle - percussion
Brian Brignac - Percussion
With:
Jimmy Buffett - vocals ("Howlin' Moon")
Eric Clapton - guitar, vocals ("When I Still Had You"), guitar ("Storm Of Worry")
Robben Ford - guitar, vocals ("Way Past Long"), guitar ("Blue Angel")
Vince Gill - guitar, vocals ("The Goin' On") vocals ("Blue Angel" & "Universe")
Dr. John - piano, vocals ("Howlin' Moon")
Eric Johnson - guitar ("The Milky Way Home")
Mark Knopfler - guitar, vocals ("Blue Tarp Blues")
Nadirah Shakoor - vocals ("Let It Fly")

References

External links
Sonny Landreth newsletter about From the Reach
Official Sonny Landreth website

2008 albums
Sonny Landreth albums